On February 10, 2021, Fani Willis, the district attorney for Fulton County, Georgia, began a criminal investigation into efforts by Donald Trump to overturn the 2020 United States presidential election in Georgia, following his defeat to Joe Biden. The investigation began as a result of a phone call Trump made to Georgia Secretary of State Brad Raffensperger, pressuring Raffensperger to alter Georgia's election results. The investigation has involved dozens of individuals, and at least eleven individuals have been subpoenaed in connection with the investigation.

Background

Accusations of electoral fraud
Throughout his 2016 presidential campaign, Trump repeatedly sowed doubt on the election certification process. Campaigning in Colorado, Trump claimed that the Democratic Party "[rigged] the election at polling booths". In October 2016, Trump claimed that widespread voter fraud had occurred in the 2016 presidential election, through a series of tweets. These statements were echoed by Rudy Giuliani, Trump's legal advisor.

Attempts to overturn the 2020 presidential election

Following Trump's defeat in the 2020 presidential election, an outside advisor to Trump known as Kenneth Chesebro began drafting a plot to purport Trump supporters as electors. Chesebro justified the plot using precedent set in the 1960 United States presidential election, by certifying a slate of electors declaring Trump the winner. Attempting to overturn the results of the election, Trump called Georgia governor Brian Kemp, asking him to convene Georgia's legislators to select electors that would support him in the election, and requested an audit of absentee ballots. Georgia certified the results of the election multiple times and reaffirmed Joe Biden's win in the state, including a final time on December 7, prior to the Electoral College vote a week later.

Trump–Raffensperger phone call

On January 2, 2021, Trump called Brad Raffensperger, the Georgia Secretary of State, pressuring him to alter the results of the 2020 presidential election in Georgia. Trump's call with Raffensperger was obtained by The Washington Post the following day.

Investigation
On February 10, 2021, Fani Willis, the district attorney for Fulton County, Georgia, began a criminal investigation into Trump's efforts to overturn the 2020 presidential election. In September 2021, Willis began interviewing election officials and staff working under Raffensperger.

Special grand jury
On January 20, 2022, Willis requested a special grand jury for her investigation into Trump. The Superior Court of Fulton County granted the request four days later.

February 2023 report
On February 13, 2023, Fulton County Superior Court Judge Robert McBurney ordered the release of three sections pertaining to the special grand jury's report. The report was released on February 16; while largely sealed, the report concluded that some of the witnesses may have committed perjury.

Subpoenas
Willis subpoenaed multiple individuals in connection with the investigation.

Responses

Trump's response

Upon the release of excerpts of the special grand jury report, Trump spokesperson Steven Cheung defended Trump and the phone call made between Trump and Raffensperger.

Other responses
Timothy J. Heaphy, the top investigator on the January 6 House select committee, has said he expects "indictments both in Georgia and at the federal level.”

References

Citations

Sources
 

Attempts to overturn the 2020 United States presidential election